Bronx Community Board 6 is a local government unit of the city of New York, encompassing the neighborhoods of Bathgate, Belmont, East Tremont, and West Farms as Bronx Community District 6. It is delimited by Bronx Park to the east and north, Webster Avenue to the west, and Crotona Park North and the Cross Bronx Expressway to the south.

Community board staff and membership
The current chairperson of the Bronx Community board 6 is Evonne Capers. Its District Manager is John Sanchez.

The City Council members representing the community district are non-voting, ex officio board members. The council members and their council districts are:
 15th NYC Council District - Oswald Feliz
 17th NYC Council District - Rafael Salamanca

Demographics
As of the United States 2000 Census, the Community District has a population of 75,688, up from 68,061 in 1990 and 65,014 in 1980.
Of them, 46,391 (61.3%) are of Hispanic origin, 19,694 (26%) are Black, non-Hispanic, 7,021 (9.3%) are White, non-Hispanic, 891 (1.2%) are Asian or Pacific Islander, 201 (0.3%) American Indian or Alaska Native, 238 (0.3%) are some other race (non-Hispanic), and 1,252 (1.7%) of two or more races (non-Hispanic).

References

External links
 

Community boards of the Bronx
Belmont, Bronx
West Farms, Bronx